Route 3 is a state-numbered route in the U.S. state of Massachusetts, maintained by the Massachusetts Department of Transportation (MassDOT). Spanning approximately  along a north–south axis, it is inventoried with U.S. Route 3 (US 3) as a single route by the state. The state-numbered Route 3 travels from Bourne in the south to Cambridge in the north, while US 3 continues from Cambridge and crosses the New Hampshire state line in Tyngsborough. Mileposts on US 3 continue from those on the state-numbered Route 3.

Route 3 begins in the south as a controlled-access highway at a junction with U.S. Route 6 (US 6) in Bourne. The highway is known as the Pilgrims Highway from Bourne to the Braintree Split at the Braintree–Quincy city line, where Route 3 meets with Interstate 93 (I-93) and U.S. Route 1 (US 1) and the three routes travel concurrently toward Boston as the Southeast Expressway. I-93, US 1, and Route 3 travel through the Central Artery and the O'Neill Tunnel in Downtown Boston, after which point Route 3 exits the concurrency and continues on surface streets. It crosses the Longfellow Bridge on the Boston–Cambridge city line, and transitions into US 3 shortly after an intersection with Route 2A in Cambridge.

Route description
Massachusetts Route 3 can be said to have three segments: the Pilgrims Highway, the concurrency with Interstate 93, and the section north of I-93 in Boston.

Pilgrims Highway is the part of Route 3 that stretches from the intersection with US 6 in Bourne to the junction with Interstate 93 in Braintree. The route is entirely controlled access and ranges from four lanes further south to six further north. Between the towns of Pembroke and Weymouth, the highway is typically composed of four lanes, but is expanded to five during rush hour. During this time, travel is authorized in the breakdown lane of the peak direction. This portion of the route stretches for approximately 43 miles.

Route 3 runs concurrently with Interstate 93 and U.S. Route 1 from Exit 7 in Braintree to Exit 18 in Boston. Along this portion of the route, it is known as the Southeast Expressway and is composed of eight lanes. Outside of rush hour, four lanes travel in each direction. However during rush hour, a high-occupancy vehicle lane (HOV) zipper lane is added to the peak direction of travel, making five lanes flow in the peak direction and three in the other. After the interchange with the Massachusetts Turnpike, just before the route enters the Tip O'Neill Tunnel in Downtown Boston, it is reduced to six lanes. The Southeast Expressway segment of Route 3 is approximately 10 miles long.

While in Downtown Boston, Route 3 is concurrent with I-93 and US-1. Route 3 exits I-93 at Exit 18, passes through Leverett Circle, and runs for a short way along the Charles River to the Longfellow Bridge, where it crosses over to Cambridge and joins Memorial Drive. On Memorial Drive, at an interchange with Route 2A, the designation of the highway changes to U.S. Route 3, which continues through Boston's northern suburbs and toward New Hampshire.

History

Route 3 began as a new designation for New England Highway 6 in 1927 when the U.S. Highway system was created and New England highway Route 3 was chosen to be US 6. The former NE 6 then took the route 3 number with U.S. Route 3 designated north of its intersection with U.S. Route 1 and Massachusetts Route 3 to the south. The route was basically a connected system of two-lane roadways up until the 1950s with the exception of Route 3's original path through Boston which paired it with US 1 on Park Drive, the Riverway and the Jamaicaway and then along its own path in Mattapan and Dorchester along the Arborway, Morton Street and Gallivan Boulevard.

Before the road was rerouted, the road continued over the Cape Cod Canal via the Sagamore Bridge to the Bourne Rotary, to the south of the Bourne Bridge. This arrangement changed after 1951.

The Plimoth Plantation Highway, a two-lane expressway that connects Route 3 with Route 3A, was once signed as Route 3 before the southernmost portion of the freeway to Cape Cod was finished.

The first section of the Pilgrims Highway was built as a bypass of Plymouth in the early 1950s. The mid-1950s saw an extension of this bypass route south to the Sagamore Bridge and north to Kingston. The northern section of the highway was built next with a connection from Derby Street in Hingham to the Southeast Expressway opening in 1959. (Portions of this road run alongside the Old Colony Railroad's mainline, now used by the MBTA Old Colony Lines Commuter Rail, and the MBTA Red Line's Braintree Branch rapid transit.) Finally the last sections between Hingham and Duxbury were completed by 1963 when the Route 3 designation was moved onto the completed freeway. The former Route 3 highways became Route 3A in Quincy and from Kingston south, the remainder became Route 53. Route 3 was connected to the Southeast Expressway in Milton by using Granite Avenue as a link from Gallivan Boulevard. Until around 1965, the northern portion of the Pilgrims Highway, from current Exit 36 (Derby Street) in Hingham, was also signed as Route 128, which continued past the exit on surface streets to Hull. However, by 1966 the 128 designation was removed past its intersection with Route 3 in Braintree (and thus from the Pilgrims Highway entirely) and the surface portion became Massachusetts Route 228. Route 3 was then taken off its remaining pathway along surface streets in Boston and extended up the Southeast Expressway and Central Artery in 1971 to the Storrow Drive exit. The routing of Route 3 has changed little since that time.

A re-signing project from 2006 to 2009 changed exit 20 to exit 20A for I-93 south and exit 20B for I-93 north. In the process, the ramp carrying Route 3 to I-93 north was no longer signed as part of Route 3. Separate signs indicating Route 3's routing along I-93 were to be installed on exit sign support poles in 2011.

Future

Milepost-based exit numbering
Route 3 was one of the freeways whose exits were once numbered with the "25 is 128" system, in which the Braintree Split was numbered "Exit 25" (due to it being the exit for Route 128), with numbers increasing away from Boston and decreasing toward Boston. Under the old system, the Sagamore Rotary was (on paper) "Exit 43." When the first  of the highway were resurfaced in 1975-76, the new numbers were instituted in that section. The Braintree section wasn't resurfaced in 1978, leaving a two-year gap when half the highway was on the new system while the other half was on the old system. During that time, the exit to Route 14 was "Exit 11" northbound and "Exit 33" southbound. Exit numbers on Route 3 were to be changed to those based on highway mileposts under a MassDOT project due to start in 2016, but this project was postponed. On November 18, 2019, MassDOT confirmed that, beginning in late summer 2020, the exit renumbering project will begin. The work was scheduled to begin along Route 3 NB during the week of December 7, 2020. The work has since been completed as of January 2021. The exits will be numbered based on mileage from the start of Route 3 at the Sagamore Bridge. They are referenced in the table below as "New Exit".

Potential road-widening project
MassDOT is looking into the possibility, in a similar manner to what happened to a 14+ mile section of Route 128 in the 2010s, of widening Route 3 from I-93 to the Sagamore Bridge from four to six lanes (as has already been done within the US 44 road concurrency between exits 15 and 16 near Plymouth) with new bridges and new on- and off-ramps, and will include upgraded interchanges with new acceleration and deceleration lanes. The project is expected to cost $256 million.

Exit list
Route 3 was one of the freeways whose exits were once numbered with the "25 is 128" system, in which the Braintree Split was numbered "Exit 25" (due to it being the exit for Route 128), with numbers increasing away from Boston and decreasing toward Boston. Under the old system, the Sagamore Rotary was (on paper) "Exit 43." When the first  of the highway were resurfaced in 1975-76, the new numbers were instituted in that section. The Braintree section wasn't resurfaced in 1978, leaving a two-year gap when half the highway was on the new system while the other half was on the old system. During that time, the exit to Route 14 was "Exit 11" northbound and "Exit 33" southbound. Exit numbers on Route 3 were to be changed to those based on highway mileposts under a MassDOT project due to start in 2016, but this project was postponed. On November 18, 2019, MassDOT confirmed that, beginning in late summer 2020, the exit renumbering project will begin. The exit renumbering was done between December 1-14, 2020.

References

 Pilgrims Highway (MA 3) on Bostonroads.com
 1952 Shell Oil Sectional Map No. 1, New England States
 1960 AAA Map of Southern New England
 1966 ESSO New England Map
 1971 ESSO Southern New England Map
 Responses to post by Bob Malme on newsgroup ne.transportation titled "MA Roadtrip Observations" posted 6/28/07.

External links

Streets in Braintree, Massachusetts
Duxbury, Massachusetts
Massachusetts Route
Kingston, Massachusetts
003
Plymouth, Massachusetts
Pembroke, Massachusetts
Marshfield, Massachusetts
Norwell, Massachusetts
Hanover, Massachusetts
Rockland, Massachusetts
Hingham, Massachusetts
Weymouth, Massachusetts
Quincy, Massachusetts
Milton, Massachusetts
Transportation in Boston
Streets in Cambridge, Massachusetts
Transportation in Barnstable County, Massachusetts
Transportation in Plymouth County, Massachusetts
Transportation in Norfolk County, Massachusetts
Transportation in Suffolk County, Massachusetts
Transportation in Middlesex County, Massachusetts
U.S. Route 3